Bolivisión is a commercial Bolivian television station based in Santa Cruz. The channel was launched on June 17, 1997.

History

Background
On September 1, 1985, América Televisión, an open television channel owned by Banco Mercantil, was launched. With its studios in the Batallón Colorados Building, the station became one of the first private channels in Bolivia. With broadcasts lasting 6 hours in its first 2 years of broadcast, its transmission schedules progressively increased to 18 hours a day. América Televisión (unrelated to the Peruvian channel of the same name) was the first private network in the country to broadcast via satellite in 1994 and was one of the first to reach the 9 capitals of the department of La Paz.

In 1995, Raúl Garáfulic (owner of Red ATB) terminated his contract with TeleOriente and stopped broadcasting on channel 9 in Santa Cruz. After the end of the partnership, Raul Garafulic bought channel 5 from Santa Cruz, which was part of the Asociación Boliviana de Canales (ABC). Therefore, ABC ceased to exist, for which the entire ABC network was subsequently sold to Ernesto Asbún, who had bought Channel 4 of Santa Cruz, Galavisión. Ernesto Asbún bought Galavisión with the intention of forming a chain of stations. By doing so, the CDT network ceased its broadcasts on that same channel.

In 1996, a group of businessmen founded Boliviana de Television, with Telesistema Boliviano from La Paz, Antena Uno Canal 6 from Cochabamba and Canal 4 Galavision from Santa Cruz. Asbún later associated with Carlos Cardona to form Bolivisión on channel 2 in La Paz. The partnership lasted a year and a half, thus dissolving the CDT Network. In 1997 and with the purchase of Telesistema Boliviano by Unitel, Bolivisión was left without a channel in La Paz.

Beginning of operations
It was on July 17, 1997 that Bolivisión was refounded, and in September of the same year it returned to the air in La Paz through channel 5 VHF. The channel acquired the rights to broadcast the matches of the France 98 Qualifiers. Later, on Wednesday, November 26, it expanded by the same tune in Oruro, broadcasting the Bolivar V.S. Wilstermann live at 7:00 p.m. Later, the station moved its studios to the fourth floor of the Shopping Norte in La Paz. Bolivisión previously broadcast sporting events such as the NBA that it presented on Sunday afternoons.

New century and first financial crisis
Ernesto Asbún, its owner, was also the owner of Lloyd Aéreo Boliviano, which was going through a severe economic crisis. Until a long time, the general manager was exactly the prominent journalist from Cochabamba and director of the Club Deportivo Jorge Wilstermann Mauricio 'El Patato' Mendez Roca, who served as manager of the network until the sale to Albavisión.

New stage with Albavisión
Once the LAB went bankrupt and before the judgment that was coming, Asbún sold Bolivisión to the Mexican Remigio Ángel González, owner of the Albavisión media conglomerate. Due to the acquisition, starting in 2007, the channel's programming began to consist of Mexican and Brazilian telenovelas from Televisa and TV Globo, respectively. All national production that was not the news was fading.

In 2012 it was the channel in charge of carrying out the international contest América celebra a Chespirito on Televisa. As of 2010, its programming on weekdays is mostly telenovelas produced by Televisa.

Presenters
Myriam Claros
Vania Borja
Héctor Uriarte
Richard Pereira
Pamela Muñoz
Nicole Rosell
Fernando Eid
Carola Castedo
Miriam Ramos

Programs

Bolivisión Al Día 
It is the main news program of Bolivisión. It airs Monday through Friday at 6:00 am, 12:40 pm and 9:00 pm. It is hosted by Carola Castedo from Santa Cruz and Miriam Ramos in La Paz. Its first broadcast was on July 6, 2011, replacing Noticias Bolivisión, previously known as Noticiero Bolivisión.

Dilema 
Reality show announced by Hans Caceres and Leonel Fransezze, produced by Smilehood Media and Kontenidos Agencia Digital. Format where gaming and entertainment stand out with earning money.

La Cancha de Bolivisión 
Sports program hosted by Richard Pereira.

Revista Al Día 
The channel's morning magazine program.

Infomercials 
Paid programs related to the Curanderia.

See also 
List of South American television stations

References

External links 
 
Bolivision Live Streaming

Spanish-language television stations
Television in Bolivia
Mass media in Santa Cruz de la Sierra